George Finch-Hatton FRS (30 June 1747 – 17 February 1823) was an English politician who sat in the House of Commons from 1772 to 1784.

Early life
Finch-Hatton was the son of Hon. Edward Finch-Hatton and was born on 30 June 1747. He was educated at Westminster School and at Christ's College, Cambridge, being awarded a Master of Arts degree in 1768. He assumed the additional surname of Hatton (his paternal grandmother's name) together with his father in 1764.

He succeeded his Uncle Daniel to Eastwell Park in 1769 and his father to Kirby Hall, near Gretton in Northamptonshire in 1771. He rebuilt the house at Eastwell between 1793 and 1800 to designs by Joseph Bonomi.

Career
Finch-Hatton was elected Member of Parliament for Rochester at a by-election in 1772. He was re-elected to Rochester in contests in 1774 and 1780 but was defeated in at the 1784 general election.

Finch-Hatton was elected a Fellow of the Royal Society in 1776.

In 1809 he was commissioned as Lieutenant-Colonel Commandant of the Ashford Regiment of Local Militia (later the 1st East Kent or Ashford, Oldcastle and Elham Regiment).

Personal life
Finch-Hatton married Lady Elizabeth Murray (1760–1825), the daughter of David Murray, 2nd Earl of Mansfield (1747–1796), in 1785. They resided at Eastwell Park, Kent. He also had estates at Kirby, Northamptonshire.

Jane Austen the author visited George and Lady Elizabeth at their Eastwell Park numerous times, they were neighbour as Jane Austen older brother reside in Godmersham Park, 4 miles away. In her letters to her sister Cassandra, Austen seemed to have feelings for George's younger Brother Edward Finch-Hatton."Eastwell was very agreeable; I found Ly. Gordon’s

manners as pleasing as they had been described, and

saw nothing to dislike in Sir Janison, excepting once

or twice a sort of sneer at Mrs Anne Finch. . . [The

Misses Finch] were very civil to me, as they always

are; fortune was also very civil to me in placing Mr E.

Hatton by me at dinner."Finch-Hatton died in February 1823 at the age of 75. His wife died in June 1825, aged 65. Their son George succeeded in the earldoms of Winchilsea and Nottingham in 1826.

References

1747 births
1823 deaths
People educated at Westminster School, London
Alumni of Christ's College, Cambridge
Members of the Parliament of Great Britain for English constituencies
British MPs 1768–1774
British MPs 1774–1780
British MPs 1780–1784
Kent Militia officers
Fellows of the Royal Society
George